Jonas Burgert (born 1969, West Berlin) is an artist based in Berlin.

He has shown work in many exhibitions including Rohkunstbau at Stipendiaten in Berlin, Geschichtenerzähler at Hamburg Kunsthalle  and Dis-Positiv at Staatsbank in Berlin. Burgert has exhibited internationally at museums and galleries such as Galerie Sfeir-Semler , Beirut and Villa Manin , Passariano, Italy and was part of the Malerei Biennale in Stockholm in 2003. He is represented by Produzentengalerie  in Hamburg BlainSouthern in London and Tang Contemporary Art in Hong Kong.

Burgert's 22 metres long painting Zeitlaich received considerable media attention when it was exhibited during the 2017  in Berlin.

See also
 List of German painters

References

External links
Jonasburgert.de

1969 births
Living people
20th-century German painters
20th-century German male artists
German male painters
21st-century German painters
21st-century German male artists
Artists from Berlin
German contemporary artists